John Mackie Falconer (1820–1903) was a Scottish-born American etcher, painter, and watercolorist. Born in Edinburgh, he came to the United States in 1836.

Biography 

John Mackie Falconer was born in Edinburgh on May 22, 1820.

A full member of the New York Etching Club, he was made an honorary member of the National Academy of Design in 1856. He is known for studies of older buildings and ruins. Falconer was a friend of Thomas Cole, Asher Durand, Jasper Francis Cropsey and other artists of the Hudson River School.

He died at his home in Brooklyn on March 12, 1903.

His works are in the collections of the Metropolitan Museum of Art, New York; the Museum of Fine Arts, Boston; the New-York Historical Society; the  Brooklyn Museum of Art; and the Columbus (Georgia) Museum.

References 

Linda S. Ferber, "Our Mr. John M. Falconer,"  Brooklyn Before the Bridge, exhibition catalog, Brooklyn Museum, 1982.
Francine Tyler, American Etchings of the Nineteenth Century, New York, Dover Books, 1984, p. XVIII.

External links 
 Brooklyn Museum of Art: Falconer, Self Portrait Plaque
 Metropolitan Museum of Art: Montmorency Falls, Canada, etching
 Brooklyn Museum of Art: At Newtown Creek, Long Island
 Negro Huts at Wilmington, North Carolina, etching
 Smithsonian Archives of American Art
 Thomas Cole’s First Studio at Catskill, New York, etching

1820 births
1903 deaths
American etchers
19th-century American painters
American male painters
20th-century American painters
British emigrants to the United States
20th-century American printmakers
19th-century American male artists
20th-century American male artists